Orły  is a village in Przemyśl County, Subcarpathian Voivodeship, in south-eastern Poland. It is the seat of the gmina (administrative district) called Gmina Orły.

The village has a population of 1,000.

References

Villages in Przemyśl County